Malpighiaceae is a family of flowering plants in the order Malpighiales. It comprises about 73 genera and 1315 species, all of which are native to the tropics and subtropics. About 80% of the genera and 90% of the species occur in the New World (the Caribbean and the southernmost United States to Argentina) and the rest in the Old World (Africa, Madagascar, and Indomalaya to New Caledonia and the Philippines).

One useful species in the family is Malpighia emarginata, often called acerola. The fruit is consumed in areas where the plant is native. The plant is cultivated elsewhere for the fruit, which is rich in vitamin C.

Another member of the family, caapi or yagé (Banisteriopsis caapi), is used in the entheogenic brew known as ayahuasca.

One feature found in several members of this family, and rarely in others, is providing pollinators with rewards other than pollen or nectar; this is commonly in the form of nutrient oils (resins are offered by Clusiaceae).

Genera

Acmanthera
Acridocarpus
Adelphia
Alicia
Amorimia
Andersoniodoxa
Aspicarpa
Aspidopterys
Banisteriopsis
Barnebya
Blepharandra
Brachylophon
Bronwenia
Bunchosia
Burdachia
Byrsonima
Calcicola
Callaeum
Camarea
Carolus
Caucanthus
Christianella
Coleostachys
Cordobia
Cottsia
Diacidia
Dicella
Digoniopterys
Dinemagonum
Dinemandra
Diplopterys
Echinopterys
Ectopopterys
Excentradenia
Flabellaria
Flabellariopsis
Gallardoa
Galphimia
Gaudichaudia
Glandonia
Glicophyllum
Heladena
Henleophytum
Heteropterys
Hiptage
Hiraea
Janusia
Jubelina
Lasiocarpus
Lophanthera
Lophopterys
Madagasikaria
Malpighia
Malpighiodes
Mascagnia
Mcvaughia
Mezia
Microsteira
Mionandra
Niedenzuella
Peixotoa
Philgamia
Psychopterys
Pterandra
Ptilochaeta
Rhynchophora
Spachea
Sphedamnocarpus
Stigmaphyllon
Tetrapterys
Thryallis
Triaspis
Tricomaria
Tristellateia
Verrucularina

References

Davis,  C. C., and W. R. Anderson. 2010. A complete phylogeny of Malpighiaceae inferred from nucleotide sequence data and morphology. American Journal of Botany 97: 2031–2048.
Michener, C. D. 2000. The Bees of the World. Johns Hopkins University Press. 913 pp. (p. 17-18)
Vogel, S. 1974. Ölblumen und ölsammelnde Bienen. [Tropische und subtropische Pflanzenwelt. 7]. 267 pp.

External links

Malpighiaceae Malpighiaceae - description, taxonomy, phylogeny, literature, and nomenclature

 
Malpighiales families